Kundarki is one of the 403 Legislative Assembly constituencies of Uttar Pradesh state in India.

It is part of Moradabad district.

Members of Legislative Assembly

Election results

2022

2017

See also
 List of constituencies of the Uttar Pradesh Legislative Assembly
 Moradabad district

References

External links
 Official Site of Legislature in Uttar Pradesh
Uttar Pradesh Government website
UP Assembly

External links
 

Assembly constituencies of Uttar Pradesh
Moradabad district